John J. McMahon may refer to:
 John J. McMahon (bishop) (1875–1932), American prelate of the Roman Catholic Church
 John J. McMahon (architect) (1875–1958), American architect

See also
 John McMahon (disambiguation)